The Acehnese (also written as Atjehnese and Achinese) are an indigenous ethnic group from Aceh, Indonesia on the northernmost tip of the island of Sumatra. The area has a history of political struggle against the Dutch colonial rule. The vast majority of the Acehnese people are Muslims. The Acehnese people are also referred to by other names such as Lam Muri, Lambri, Akhir, Achin, Asji, A-tse and Atse. Their language, Acehnese, belongs to the Aceh–Chamic group of Malayo-Polynesian of the Austronesian language family.

The Acehnese were at one time partially Hinduised, as evident from their traditions and the many Sanskrit words in their language. They have been Muslims for several centuries and are generally considered the most conservative Muslim ethnic group in Indonesia with the implementation of Sharia law in their home province of Aceh. The estimated number of Acehnese ranges between 3,526,000 people and at least 4.2 million people

Traditionally, there have been many Acehnese agriculturists, metal-workers and weavers. Traditionally matrilocal, their social organisation is communal. They live in gampôngs, which combine to form districts known as mukims. The golden era of Acehnese culture began in the 16th century, along with the rise of the Islamic Aceh Sultanate and later reaching its peak in the 17th century. Generally, the Acehnese people are regarded as strict adherents to the Islamic faith and also as militant fighters against the colonial conquest of the Portuguese Empire and the Dutch Empire.

Aceh came to international attention as being the hardest-hit region of the 2004 Indian Ocean earthquake with 120,000 people dead.

Origins

Archaeological evidence of the earliest inhabitants of Aceh are from the Pleistocene age, where they lived in the west coast of Aceh (Langsa and Aceh Tamiang Regency region) and they exhibited Australomelanesoid characteristics. They mainly lived from seafood, especially various types of shellfish, as well as land animals such as pigs and rhinoceros. They had already used fire and buried bodies with certain rituals.

The migration of the indigenous tribes, the Mantir people and the Lhan people (Proto-Malay), as well as the Chams, Malays and Minangkabau people (Deutero-Malay) who arrived later, formed the pribumi dwellers of Aceh. Foreign ethnicity, especially Indians, as well as a small part of Arabs, Persians, Turks and Portuguese are also components of the Acehese people. The strategic position of Aceh in the northern tip of the Sumatra island for thousands of years has become a haven and inter-marriage of various people group, namely those that are in the sea trade route from the Middle East to China.

Native Southeast Asian peoples

Chinese and Indian sources from 500 CE and onward mention that there was a settlement in northernmost Sumatra (Aceh) which was called P'o-lu. Many scholars believe that P'o-lu was close to the what is now Banda Aceh. These sources also state that the average person wore cotton clothing while the ruling elite wore silk. The Chinese annals also claim that the local people were Buddhist.

Acehnese folklore has it that the earliest people of Aceh came from the indigenous tribes such as the Mante people and the Lhan people. The Mante people is a local native people group allegedly related to the Batak, Gayonese and Alas people, while the Lhan people is allegedly still related to the Semang people group who have migrated from the Malay Peninsula or the Indochina (Champa and Burma). Initially, the Mante people settled in Aceh Besar Regency and later began to spread to other regions.

Around the ninth and tenth century there was an influx of Arabian and Persian merchants to the Aceh region. When Marco Polo visited the area in 1292, he mentions that some of the port cities and towns had already converted to Islam. It is commonly thought that when the Samudera Pasai Sultanate was founded, Islam was fully established in the region. Nonetheless, it is clear that Islam was a major religion in and around Aceh by the thirteenth century.

During the decline of the Srivijaya kingdom, it is estimated that a number of Malay people began to migrate to Aceh. They then settled down in the valleys of Tamiang River and later became known as the Tamiang people. After they were conquered by the Samudera Pasai Sultanate kingdom (1330), only then did they begin to integrate into Acehnese society; although in terms of cultural and linguistic, there are still similarities with the Malay culture. By the sixteenth century, Aceh was an important cultural and scholastic Islamic center influential throughout much of Southeast Asia.

Most of the Minangkabau people who migrated to Aceh settled around Meulaboh and Krueng Seunagan valley. Generally in these fertile areas they manage wet paddy fields and pepper farming, as well as some trading. The mixed population of Acehnese-Minangkabau people is also found in the southern region, namely in the areas around Susoh, Tapaktuan and Labuhan Haji. There are many who converse daily in both Acehnese language and their own native dialect, the Aneuk Jamee language.

As a result of the political expansion and diplomatic relations of the Aceh Sultanate with their surrounding region, the Acehnese people were also mixed with the Alas people, Gayonese, Karo people, Nias people and Kluet people. The unification of the Acehnese culture that stemmed from various ancestry are primarily in the Acehnese language, religion of Islam and the local customs, as how it was formulated by Sultan Iskandar Muda in the Adat Makuta Alamlaws, which is well known as "Kanun Mahkota Alam".

India
There are many of those who are of Indian descent in Aceh, which are closely linked to trading and the spreading of Hinduism-Buddhism and Islam in Aceh. Those who are of Indian descent are mainly Tamils and Gujarati people which are found spread throughout the entire Aceh. Among some of the Indian people's influence on the Acehnese people includes the cultural aspects and physical attributes of part of the Acehnese people, as well as the variety in Acehnese cuisine that frequently utilizes curry. Numerous place names of Sanskrit origin (for example, Indrapuri, Aceh Besar) reflects the cultural heritage of Hinduism in the past.

Arab, Persia and Turkey
<blockquote class="toccolours" style="text-align:justify; width:25%; float:right; padding: 10px; display:table; margin-left:10px;">"The tribe of the Three Hundred is (insignificant) as the seeds of the drang (a bush which grows like a weed along fences);The people of the clan Ja Sandang are even as anise and cummin (thus a little more valuable).Those of the Ja Batèë (count) for something;The Imeum Peuët it is which makes the world to tremble." <p style="text-align: right;">— Oral poem (hadih maja) from  Snouck Hurgronje's De Atjeher''''.</blockquote>

Most of the Arabs that migrated to Aceh came from Hadhramaut, Yemen. Among the immigrants are those of the Ba Alawi including al-Aydrus (Aidrus, Aydarus), al-Attas, al-Kathiri, Badjubier, Sungkar, Bawazier & al-Habsyi and other clans; all of which are Arabic clans that originated from Yemen. They came as ulamas to spread Islam and as traders. Seunagan district for an instance, is well known to this today for numerous of ulamas of the Sayyid descent, of which the local community would address them with the title Teungku Jet or Habib as a form of respect. Similarly, some of the Sultan of Aceh are also descendants of Sayyid. Many of their descendants today have intermarried with the natives Acehnese people and do no longer bear their clan names.

There are also those of Persian descent that generally came to spread religion and to trade, while those of Turkish descent generally were invited as ulamas, weapon merchants, military trainers and soldiers of war for the Aceh Sultanate. At present, people of Persian and Turkish descent in Indonesia are mostly scattered in Aceh Besar Regency. Names of Persian and Turkish heritage are still being used by Acehnese people to name their children. In fact, the word Banda in the name of Banda Aceh city is also a word of Persian language in origin (Banda'' means "port").

Portugal
People of Portuguese descent are found mainly in the Aceh Jaya Regency (northwest section of Aceh). Portuguese sailors under the lieutenant leadership of Captain Pinto, were sailing towards Malacca, stopped by and traded there; where some of them remained and settled there. History records that this event occurred between 1492 and 1511; of which at that time the area was under the rule of a small kingdom called Lamno, with King Meureuhom Daya as their ruler. Until this day, some of their descendants can still be seen with European features.

Language

Acehnese language falls under the Aceh–Chamic languages category, a branch of the Malayo-Polynesian languages from the Austronesian languages. Languages that are closely related with the Acehnese language are Cham language, Roglai language, Jarai language, Rade language, Chru language, Tsat language, as well as other Chamic languages that are spoken in Cambodia, Vietnam and Hainan. There are also loan words from Mon-Khmer languages which indicates that there are possibilities that the forebears of the Acehnese people might have lived in the Malay peninsula or Southern Thailand that borders with the Mon-Khmer speakers before migrating to Sumatra. Vocabulary of the Acehnese language have been enriched by absorption from Sanskrit and Arabic language, especially in the field of religion, laws, governance, warfare, arts and knowledge. For centuries, the Acehnese language have also absorbed a lot from the Malay language. Malay language and Minangkabau language are related to the subsequent Aceh–Chamic languages; which falls together under the same category of Western Malayo-Polynesian languages.

Initially, a group of Chamic languages migrant speakers controlled a small region only, namely Banda Aceh in Aceh Besar Regency. Marco Polo (1292) states that Aceh at that time consists of 8 smaller kingdoms, with each of them possessing their own language. The expansion of power on other coastal kingdoms, especially Pidie, Pasai and Daya, and absorption of their population over time in a period of 400 years, eventually made the language of the Banda Aceh population became dominant in the coastal region of Aceh. Other native languages speakers were then forced into the interior by the expansion of land for farming by the Acehnese language speakers.

Dialects of the Acehnese language that are found in the Aceh Besar Regency valley are divided into two major groups, namely the Tunong dialect for dialects in the highlands and Baroh dialect for dialects in the lowlands. Most of the dialects that are used in Aceh Besar Regency and Daya, shows that settlements in that region have existed longer than any other regions. There are also many dialects in Pidie Regency, although not as much as in Aceh Besar Regency and Daya. Dialects on the east coast of Pidie Regency and in southern Daya tend to be more homogeneous, so much so that it is co-related with the migration that came along with the expansion of power of the Aceh Sultanate after the 1500s.

Local government of Aceh, among others through Governor's Decree No. 430/543/1986 and Perda No. 2 of 1990 established the Institute of Acehnese Customary and Culture (Lembaga Adat dan Kebudayaan Aceh, LAKA), with the mandate to develop the customs and norms of the communities and customary institutions in Aceh. Indirectly, this institution protects the preservation of the Acehnese language because in every cultural and customary activity, the delivery of such activities is carried out in the Acehnese language. Likewise, the Acehnese language is also commonly used in everyday affairs that are organized by government agencies in Aceh.

Culture

Dances 

Traditional Acehnese dance portrays the heritage culture, religion and folklore of the common folk. Acehnese dance are generally performed in groups, either in a standing or sitting position, and the group of dancers are of the same gender. If seen from the musical standpoint, the dance can be grouped into two types. One is accompanied with vocals and physical percussive movements of the dancers themselves, and the other is simply accompanied by an assemble of musical instruments.
 Laweut
 Likok Pulo
 Pho (dance)
 Rabbani Wahed
 Ranup lam Puan
 Rapa'i Geleng
 Rateb Meuseukat
 Ratoh Duek
 Seudati
 Tarek Pukat
 Saman

Traditional cuisine

Acehnese cuisine is known for its combination of spices just as are commonly found in Indian and Arabic cuisine, such as ginger, pepper, coriander, cumin, cloves, cinnamon, cardamom and fennel. A variety of Acehnese food is cooked with curry or curry and coconut milk, which is generally combined with meat such as buffalo, beef, mutton, fish, or chicken. Several types of traditional recipe use a blend of cannabis as a flavoring spice; such cases are also found in the cuisine of some other Southeast Asian countries, such as Laos. However today, those substances are no longer used.
 Ayam tangkap
 Bhoi
 Eungkot paya
 Kuwah eungkôt yèe
 Kuah beulangong
 Kanji rumbi
 Keumamah
 Kuwah pliëk-u
 Martabak aceh
 Masam keueueng
 Meuseukat
 Mie aceh
 Mie caluk
 Nasi gurih
 Roti cane
 Roti jala
 Sambai asam udeueng
 Sate matang
 Sie reuboh
 Sop sumsum
 Timphan

Overseas Acehnese 

Due to conflict since Dutch invasion to Aceh to Martial Law in Aceh and the 2004 Indian Ocean earthquake, many Acehnese fled abroad. The most significant number of Acehnese can be found in Malaysia and Scandinavia countries. Acehnese immigrants also can be found significantly in Australia, United States and Canada.

Notable people

Indonesia
 Azriana Manalu
 Sultan Iskandar Muda
 Sultan Ali Mughayat Syah
 Sultan Iskandar Thani Alauddin Mughayat Syah
 Sulṭāna Taj ul-Alam Safiatuddin Syah
 Sulṭāna Nurul Alam Naqiatuddin Syah
 Sulṭāna Inayat Zakiatuddin Syah
 Paduka Seri Baginda Sultan Zainatuddin Kamalat Syah
 Perkasa Alam Syarif Lamtui
 Jamal ul-Alam Badr ul-Munir
 Sultan Jauhar ul-Alam Amauddin Syah
 Sultan Syamsul Alam
 Sultan Alauddin Ibrahim Mansur Syah
 Sultan Alauddin Muhammad Da'ud Syah I
 Sultan Alauddin Muhammad Da'ud Syah II
 Cut Nyak Dhien
 Cut Nyak Meutia
 Teungku Chik di Tiro
 Teuku Muhammad Hasan
 Teuku Umar
 Teuku Jacob
 Hasan di Tiro
 Teuku Wisnu
 Admiral Keumala Hayati
 Sultan Malikussaleh
 Surya Paloh

Outside Indonesia

Malaysia

 Datuk Seri Tengku Adnan Tengku Mansor
 P. Ramlee
 Hanafiah Hussain
 Sanusi Junid
 Badruddin Amiruldin

See also 

 Insurgency in Aceh
 Rumoh Aceh

Notes

Bibliography

References

External links 
 Ethnologue.com on Aceh language

 
Ethnic groups in Indonesia
Ethnic groups in Sumatra
Ethnic groups in Aceh
Muslim communities of Indonesia
Ethnic groups in Malaysia
Refugees in Malaysia